Gisela of Kerzenbroeck or Gisela von Kerssenbrock (died by 1300) was a nun in the northern German city of Rulle who probably worked most of her life writing and illustrating manuscripts, as well as being choirmistress.

Codex Gisle
Gisela de Kerzenbroeck is documented only as the creator of what is now known as Codex Gisle or "Gradual of Gisela von Kerssenbrock", a gradual made for the Cistercian convent of Rulle near Osnabrück in Westphalia, and now in Osnabrück. The following words are inscribed in a fourteenth-century charterhand on the first folio:

This inscription was added after Gisela’s death, although possibly some considerable time after, judging from the style of the manuscript .

The manuscript contains 52 historiated initials, two of which include portraits of Gisela, marked with tituli.

Notes

References

(all in German)
 Beer, Ellen J., Gotische Buchmalerei: Literatur von 1945 bis 1961 (Fortsetzung und Schluß), Zeitschrift für Kunstgeschichte, Vol. 28, H. 1/2 (1965), pp. 134–158, Deutscher Kunstverlag GmbH, Munchen & Berlin, JSTOR
 Osnabrück, Gymnasium Carolinum und Bischofliches Generalvikariat, MS C. Dolfen, Codex Gisle (Berlin, 1926)
 R. Kroos, ‘Der Codex Gisle I. Forschungsbericht und Datierung’, Niederdeutsche Beitrage fur Kunstgeschichte, 12 (1973), pp. 117–34
 H. Feldwisch-Drentrup and A. Jung, Dom und Domschatz in Osnabrück (Stuttgart, 1980), pp. 32 and 68
 Braunschweig, Herzog Anton Ulrich Museum, Stadt im Wandel: Kunst und Kultur des Bürgertums in Norddeutschland 1160-1659 (Braunschweig, 1985), no.1084, pp. 1246–49 by R. Kroos.

Further reading
 Singing with Angels: Liturgy, Music and Art in the Gradual of Gisela von Kerssenbrock by Judith H. Oliver, BREPOLS, 2007

Manuscript illuminators
Year of birth unknown
Year of death unknown
13th-century women artists
13th-century German women
Medieval German women artists
13th-century German artists
Medieval European scribes